Roger Vonlanthen (5 December 1930 – July 2020) was a Swiss football player and manager.

During his club career he played for Grasshoppers (1951–55), Inter Milan (1955–57), Alessandria (1957–59) and Lausanne (1959–66). He earned 27 caps and scored 8 goals for the Switzerland national football team from 1954 to 1966, and participated in two World Cups (1954 and 1962). Later he became a manager with Servette, Lausanne and CS Chênois and had a stint as the manager of Switzerland from 1977 to 1979.

In March 2021, it was announced Vonlanthen died the previous year, in July at the age of 89 in Onex.

References

External links

1930 births
2020 deaths
Swiss men's footballers
Swiss football managers
Switzerland national football team managers
Switzerland international footballers
1954 FIFA World Cup players
1962 FIFA World Cup players
Swiss expatriate footballers
Expatriate footballers in Italy
Serie A players
Grasshopper Club Zürich players
Inter Milan players
U.S. Alessandria Calcio 1912 players
FC Lausanne-Sport players
Servette FC players
Servette FC managers
FC Lausanne-Sport managers
Sportspeople from the canton of Geneva
Swiss Super League players
Association football forwards